This is a listing of the broadcasters and published media targeted at Rockford, Illinois.

Radio
Start dates are for the frequency/station license, not for callsign or programming that may have moved from license to license.

FM

  displays artist and title on Radio Data System
  FM translator: repeats another station's program

AM

Television

Rockford is one of a few US markets with no PBS station of its own. PBS Wisconsin member station WHA-TV (UHF channel 20, virtual channel 21.1) in neighboring Madison and Chicago-based WTTW serve as the default member stations for the Rockford market via cable and satellite; the former station's over-the-air analog signal was viewable in portions of the Rockford area prior to the 2009 digital television transition.

Print media
 Chronicles: A Magazine of American Culture - monthly magazine; founded 1977; features executive editor Scott P. Richert's monthly column about Rockford, "The Rockford Files"
 Community Bargain Hunter - weekly classified publication; founded 2006; circulation 16,000
 Northwest Quarterly - quarterly magazine; circulation 176,300
 Rock River Times - weekly newspaper; independently owned since 1987; circulation 2,500
 Rockford Register Star - daily newspaper; founded 1855; circulation 50,000

References

Rockford, Illinois
Rockford, Illinois